A tropical fish is a fish found in a tropical environment.

Tropical Fish may also refer to:

Tropical Fish (film), a 1995 Taiwanese comedy-drama film
"Tropical Fish", an episode of the television series Teletubbies
"Tropical Fish" (book)